Sam Gardner may refer to:

 Sam Gardner (soccer) (born 1997), Canadian soccer player
 Sam Gardner (Atypical), fictional character in comedy-drama TV series Atypical
 Samwise Gamgee, fictional gardener of Frodo Baggins' in J. R. R. Tolkien's Middle-earth

See also 
 Samuel Gardner (disambiguation)
 Sam Gardiner (disambiguation)